The Big Bud 747 or 16V-747 Big Bud is a large, custom-made farm tractor built in Havre, Montana, in 1977. It has 1100 horsepower. It is billed by the owners and exhibitors as the "World's Largest Farm Tractor". It is about twice the size of many of the largest production tractors in the world, depending on parameter.

History
The first two Big Bud tractors out of the Havre, Montana plant were the 250-series and were purchased by Leonard M. Semenza of Semenza Farms in 1968 located between Fort Benton, Montana, and Chester, Montana on his 35,000 acre farm. The 747 tractor was originally  and built by Ron Harmon and the employees of his Northern Manufacturing Company, at a cost of $300,000. It was made for the Rossi Brothers, cotton farmers of Bakersfield or Old River, California. It was used there for eleven years; it was then purchased by Willowbrook Farms of Indialantic, Florida. Both farms used it for deep ripping.

In 1997, after a period of disuse, it was purchased by Robert and Randy Williams, of Big Sandy, Montana, within  of where it was built.

The United Tire Company of Canada, which made the tractor's custom  tires, went bankrupt in 2000, partially contributing to the decision to stop using the tractor for regular work in July 2009, and to move the Big Bud 747 to museums.

After its work on the farm, it was displayed at the Heartland Acres Agribition Center in Independence, Iowa. In 2014, the Big Bud 747 was moved to the Heartland Museum in Clarion, Iowa, on indefinite loan from the Williams Brothers; the museum constructed a separate shed for the tractor in 2013.

On July 14, 2020, the Big Bud's original eight-foot tall construction tires were replaced with Goodyear LSW1400/30r46 tires (which are slightly under seven feet tall), with new rims provided by the Williams Brothers to fit them. The new tires brought the width of the Big Bud to just over 25 feet.

The Big Bud 747 returned to the Williams Brothers farm near Big Sandy, Montana, in September 2020, where it worked farm ground once again with an 80-foot wide FRIGGSTAD chisel plow.

Statistics

General
 Height:  to top of cab New tires are about  shorter than original tires lowering height several inches. 
 Length:  frame;  to end of drawbar
 Width:  over fenders;  over duals
 Wheelbase: 
 Tires:  in diameter;  in width; 
 Weight:  shipping weight; over  when  tank is full;  fully ballasted

Tank capacities
 Fuel capacity:   (diesel fuel)
 Hydraulic reservoir:  tank

Engine
 Detroit Diesel 16V92T: 16-cylinder, two-cycle engine
 Induction: 2 turbochargers, 2 superchargers
 Starter: 24 volts; all other electrical is 12 volts
 Alternator: 75 ampere

Transmission
 Forward speeds: 6
 Reverse speeds: 1

Other

Comparison
For perspective, many of the largest production tractors such as the John Deere 9630 are about half the horsepower, less than half the ballasted weight, and often use a more standard six cylinder class 8 truck engine.
By the 2020s there were several new tractors over  but still weighing much less, including the  Fendt 1167 with a low rpm engine.

References

External links
 Williams Big Bud Tractor – official website

Vehicles introduced in 1977
Chouteau County, Montana
Buchanan County, Iowa
Hill County, Montana
Tractors
Individual vehicles